Secretary for Public Works may refer to 

 Secretary for Public Works (New South Wales) a minister in the government of New South Wales, Australia
 Secretary for Public Works (Queensland) a minister in the government of Queensland, Australia